Astyochus or Astyochos was a Spartan navarch who served as commander of the collective Spartan naval forces along the coast of Asia Minor from 412–411 BC. He is regarded by many contemporaries and modern scholars as a key reason for Sparta's early failures in the Ionian War. His expeditions consisting of involvements in Lesbos, Chios, Erythrae and Clazomenae all proved unsuccessful. He also refused requests for help from Chios, causing the Spartan administration to become increasingly dissatisfied with his leadership. Thucydides portrays Astyochus as timid and inept, and also depicts him often in conflict with his peers in Ionia. Toward the end of his role of commander, he exhibited great reluctance to attack the Athenians and also failed to properly pay his troops, leading to riots and violence, and eventually, his removal as commander in 412 BC, to be replaced by the Spartan Mindarus.

Involvement in the Peloponnesian War 
In 412 BC, Astyochus replaced Melancridas as the leader of the naval forces, and was assigned to assist the cities on the mainland of Asia Minor, as well as the surrounding islands along the coast. His immediate task was to advance the Spartan agenda by weakening the allegiances of these areas to Athens, as well as to demonstrate the continued support of Spartan control and assistance through his presence. At this time, the Athenians had already lost their position in Sicily for a year, and had also just lost their foothold in Chios due to revolt. Astyochus arrived off Chios with four galleys. However, Lesbos had recently transformed into a war zone, as the Chians had incited revolts in the key cities of Methymna and Mytilene. The Athenians stormed Mytilene in response, and Astyochus, upon his arrival, found that he could offer no help. The resulting Athenian recapture of Lesbos occurred as Astyochus withdrew to Chios.

Athens' next move was to launch an attack on Chios in an attempt to restore its sovereignty. The attack was so successful that some Chians began plotting and conspiring to restore Athenian leadership in Chios. Astyochus was then accordingly summoned by the government when they learned of news of the revolt and was therefore tasked with neutralising the threat posed by the conspirators. The revolt was somewhat suppressed due to some of the conspirators being taken hostage by Astyochus and his Chian supporters. During this time, Theramenes, a Lacedaemonian, delivered to Astyochus a large fleet of 55 Peloponnesian and Sicilian ships. This reinforcement to the Spartan forces removed Astyochus' worry about the Chian revolt, so he instead turned his attention to Clazomenae, where he made an unsuccessful attempt to capture the area.

Following his failed attempt at Clazomenae, Astyochus' assistance in a second uprising against Athens was requested by Spartan representatives at Lesbos. While Astyochus was eager to provide help, he was nevertheless forced to return to Chios after the plans for insurrection were opposed by the Corinthians and other Spartan allies. Now back at Chios, Astyochus listened to new proposals for a revolt from the people of Lesbos. While Astyochus supported these new plans, he was once again forced into inaction as the plans were opposed by the Chians and Pedaritus, the commander of the Spartan land force. The opposition that he was receiving greatly angered Astyochus, and he vowed to never come to the assistance of the Chians again. He then sailed to take command of the Peloponnesian and Sicilian fleet, recently delivered by Theramenes. On his journey, he narrowly escaped capture by the Athenians and eventually assembled his forces at Miletus.

In Miletus, a recently signed treaty between the Kings of Persia and Sparta was revised with Astyochus' assistance. The revised treaty contained updated terms that were skewed toward Spartan interest. Meanwhile, Chios came under attack by Athenians, prompting them to request Miletus for aid. However, per his last vow, Astyochus denied this request for assistance, causing Pedaritus to report his conduct to Sparta. The worsening plight of the Chian position meant that Pedaritus continued to urge Astyochus for his aid, while Chios could still be saved. However, when Astyochus was finally preparing to aid the Chians, he suddenly gave up the expedition, and proceeded southwards to escort a fleet with 11 Spartan commissioners to Miletus. This fleet of 27 galleys and 11 commissioners originated from Peloponnesus, and were tasked to decide to either aid or depose of Astyochus. On the journey to Miletus, Astyochus attacked and sacked the island of Cos. He then sailed to Cnidus, after defeating the Athenian admiral, Charminus, with minimal casualties. At Cnidus, the Spartan commissioners questioned Tissaphernes, a Persian satrap under the Spartan-Persian alliance, angering him so greatly in the process that he left them soon after. It was around this time, at Miletus, that Astyochus appeared to sell himself to Tissaphernes, and also did not play a pivotal role in the successful revolt of the Rhodians from Athens by the united Peloponnesian fleet.

The increasing suspicion of the Spartans on Alcibiades and his interest among the Asiatic Greeks meant that Astyochus eventually received orders to kill Alcibiades. However, Astyochus betrayed this agenda. When he received a letter from Phrynichus, the Athenian commander, informing him that Alcibiades was exerting influence over Tissaphernes to the detriment of Sparta, Astyochus instead travelled to Magnesia to deliver this letter to Alcibiades and Tissaphernes at their residence. Furthermore, when Astyochus received a second letter from Phrynichus offering to betray the Athenian stronghold at Samos, he did the same. Thucydides offers further evidence of Astyochus' defection to Tissaphernes: his submission to the pay cut of Peloponnesian sailors, and his lack of action in capitalising on the weakened and disorganised Athenian forces in Samos and the Hellespont during 411 BC. In addition, Astyochus not only failed to pay the troops, but also refused to attack the Athenians at Samos under the guise of waiting for further reinforcement in the form of a Phoenician armament that Tissaphernes had promised. However, Astyochus eventually did set sail with 112 galleys to attack the Athenians at Samos, as he had faced strong pressure and complaints from the Syracusan sailors and the Peloponnesian soldiers at Miletus. Nevertheless, the fighting never ensued, and it is almost certain that Astyochus did not desire engagement. Meanwhile, the troops' wages, both that of common soldiers and higher-ranked officers, continued to be neglected by Tissaphernes. Soon, Astyochus was charged with having sold the troops' interests to Tissaphernes, and Astyochus' threats towards some of the Syracusans demanding their wages only served to incite a riot, in which he was almost killed. It was at this point in time which Astyochus set sail for home, and was relieved of his duties after 8 months in command, and was succeeded by Mindarus, arriving from Sparta.

References

Ancient Spartan admirals
Spartans of the Peloponnesian War
5th-century BC births
Year of birth unknown
Year of death unknown